SS William Gaston (MC contract 159) was a Liberty ship built in the United States during World War II. She was named after William Gaston, member of the U.S. House of Representatives from North Carolina, author of the North Carolina state song, and namesake of Gaston County, North Carolina.

The ship was laid down by North Carolina Shipbuilding Company in their Cape Fear River yard on May 23, 1942, then launched on July 19, 1942. She was operated by the American West Africa Line for the War Shipping Administration.

Two torpedoes struck the vessel ten minutes apart. Gaston rolled over and sank three minutes after the second torpedo without loss of life.

References 

Liberty ships
Ships built in Wilmington, North Carolina
1942 ships
Maritime incidents in July 1944